The Gay Retreat is a 1927 American silent comedy film directed by Benjamin Stoloff and starring Gene Cameron, Betty Francisco, Judy King, Sammy Cohen, Jerry Madden, and Holmes Herbert. The film was released by Fox Film Corporation on September 25, 1927.

Cast
Gene Cameron as Richard Wright
Betty Francisco as Betty Burnett
Judy King as Joan Moret
Sammy Cohen as Sam Nosenbloom
Jerry Madden as Jerry (as Jerry the Giant)
Holmes Herbert as Charles Wright
Ted McNamara as Ted McHiggins
Charles Gorman as Edward Fulton
Pal the Dog as Pal

Preservation
A print of the film survives at the EYE Film Institute Netherlands.

References

External links

1927 comedy films
Silent American comedy films
1927 films
American silent feature films
American black-and-white films
Fox Film films
Films directed by Benjamin Stoloff
1920s American films